The Golden Belt or Shah's Coronation Belt is a 119 cm belt with a unique, 176 carat emerald on it. It also is decorated with 60 brilliant diamonds and 145 other type diamonds. Currently, it is kept in the National Treasury of Iran in Tehran.

This belt was created at the command of Naser al-Din Shah Qajar.

See also
Kiani Crown
Pahlavi Crown
Daria-i-Noor

References

Iranian National Jewels
Qajar Iran